The Instituto Bioclon S.A. de C.V. (Bioclon Institute) was formed in 1990 to research and develop F(ab’)2 antivenoms. On May 6, 2015 they received approval from the FDA to commercialize ANAVIP becoming their second drug approved by the FDA after ANASCORP. Both are commercialized in the US by Rare Disease Therapeutics, Inc. The company is performing clinical trials to get approval for a third drug, ANALATRO, designed to treat black widow spider envenomation.

Operations

Products
Coralmyn® - coral snake antivenom
Antivipmyn® - pit viper antivenom
Antivipmyn® TRI – Central and South American snakes
Antivipmyn® Africa – African snakes
Alacramyn® - scorpion antivenom
Reclusmyn® - brown recluse antivenom
Aracmyn® - black widow antivenom

The Bioclon Institute is the only Mexican company that has obtained an "orphan drug" status from the Food and Drug Administration (FDA) of the United States for its products.

References

External links 
 Instituto Bioclon
 Food and Drug Administration
 Laboratorios Silanes
 Rare Disease Therapeuthics, Inc

See also

Alejandro Alagón Cano
Lourival Possani Postay

Toxicology organizations
Organizations based in Mexico City